The festival of San Fermín is a weeklong, historically rooted celebration held annually in the city of Pamplona, Navarre, in northern Spain.
The celebrations start at noon on July 6 and continue until midnight on July 14. A firework starts off the celebrations and the popular song  is sung at the end. The most famous event is the running of the bulls, which begins at 8 in the morning from July 7 to 14, but the festival involves many other traditional and folkloric events. It is known locally as Sanfermines and is held in honour of Saint Fermin, the co-patron of Navarre.

Its events were central to the plot of The Sun Also Rises by Ernest Hemingway, which brought it to the general attention of the English-speaking world. It has become probably the most internationally renowned festival in Spain with over a million people coming to participate.

History

Saint Fermín

Fermín is said to have been the son of a Roman of senatorial rank in Pamplona in the 3rd century, who was converted to Christianity by Saint Honestus, a disciple of Saint Saturninus. According to tradition, he was baptised by Saturninus (in Navarre also known as Saint Cernin) at the spot now known as the "Small Well of Saint Cernin" Fermín was ordained a priest in Toulouse, and returned to Pamplona as its first bishop. On a later preaching voyage, Fermín was dragged to death; and is now considered a martyr in the Catholic Church. It is believed he died on September 25, AD 303. There is no written record of veneration of the Saint in Pamplona until the 12th century. Saint Fermín, as well as Saint Francis Xavier, are now the two patrons of Navarre. In Pamplona, Saint Fermín is now sometimes said to have met his end by being dragged through the streets with angry bulls running after him, hence the tradition.

The celebration of the festival has its origin in the combination of two different medieval events. Commercial secular fairs were held at the beginning of the summer. As cattle merchants came into town with their animals, eventually bullfighting came to be organised as a part of the tradition. Specifically, they were first documented in the 14th century. On the other hand, religious ceremonies honouring the saint were held on October 10. However, in 1591 they were transferred to July 7 to take place at the same time as the fair, when Pamplona's weather is better. This is considered to be the beginning of the Sanfermines. During medieval times acts included an opening speech, musicians, tournaments, theatre, bullfights, dances or even fireworks. Bullrunning appears in 17th and 18th century chronicles together with the presence of foreigners and the first concerns about the excessive drinking and dissolute behaviour during the event. Finally, the Parade of Giants was created in the mid-19th century. The first official bullring was constructed in 1844.

Present 

The worldwide fame of the modern festival, and the great number of foreign visitors it receives every year, are closely related to the description in Ernest Hemingway's book The Sun Also Rises and the reports he made as a journalist. He was fascinated when he first visited in 1923, and returned many times until 1959. Hemingway was also deeply fond of bullrunnings and bullfights, but he did not participate in the running. Different city locations such as La Perla Hotel or the Iruña Café are famous in part due to the fact that the writer used to visit them. Another famous American author, James Michener, wrote extensively about the festival and bullfighting in his non-fiction book Iberia. His writing explained the art and business of bullfighting with tremendous 'gracia' by explaining the importance of 'pundonor'.

Past 
The San Fermín Festival of the past was not like it is today: it has changed gradually both for better and for worse. Originally most of the youth looked forward to the festivities all year, saving money until they had at least fifty pesetas, the minimum necessary to watch the running of the bulls, have a snack and wine, eat lunch and dinner out, and eat churros with brandy a couple of times each San Fermín day.

After the religious function, the group formed by the Authorities and village, they came back to the Home of “the town”, at about 90 minutes after leaving it. Then was effectuated the move, to contemplate the bulls that while they were waiting to move, they grazed in the grove.

The COVID-19 pandemic caused the festival to be cancelled in 2020 and 2021.

One day events

Chupinazo

The opening of the festival is marked by setting off the firework chupinazo (or txupinazo in Basque language). The rocket is launched at 12:00 noon on July 6 from a city hall balcony with thousands of people celebrating the act in the city hall square and other locations in Pamplona. The chupinazo has officially marked the beginning of the fiesta since 1941. The person who sets it off is decided by the city mayor. Nevertheless, since 1979 tradition has been that each year after city elections the chupinazo is set off by a person from the different city council political groups beginning with the mayor and then political groups ordered by number of representatives. There have been exceptions to this tradition with some non-politicians being in charge of the act when they had performed significant achievements during the year. Examples of these exceptions were a player of the local soccer team, or the president of the "giants and big-heads" group in its 150 years anniversary. Following the rocket firing, a pipe band playing percussion and Txistus play amongst the crowds, and then marches off the main square.

Riau-Riau
The Riau-Riau was a mass activity held on July 6. The members of the city council parade from the City Hall to a nearby chapel dedicated to Saint Fermín with participants dancing to the Astrain Waltz along the way. The ritual was introduced in 1911 by Ignacio Baleztena Ascárate. The procession was removed from the festival calendar in 1992 for the sake of public order, as political activists used the "Riau-Riau" to promote clashes with authorities. Protesting youths would often block the way and it often took up to five hours for the city councilors to walk the 500 meters to the Saint Fermin chapel. Nevertheless, in recent years it has been held unofficially without the participation of the members of the city council. In 1996 and 2012 there were two failed attempts to restore the original act with the participation of the city council, both of them being cancelled due to the violent clashes with some participants.

Saint Fermín procession

The key day of the festival is July 7, when thousands of people accompany the 15th-century statue of Saint Fermin through the old part of Pamplona. The statue is accompanied by dancers and street entertainers, and different political and religious authorities including the city mayor and the Bishop of Pamplona, who leads High Mass before the event. During procession a Jota (an ancient traditional dance) is performed for the saint, a rose is offered in the Saint Fermin well, and the "gigantes" (enormous wood-framed and papier-mâché puppet figures managed from inside) dance and twirl while the cathedral bell named María (Mary) peals. Mass is held in the city cathedral, as well as in city parishes in honor of the patron.

Struendo
"El Struendo" ("The Roar") is a single day event with more than 50 years of tradition. It has been purposely left outside the official program and each year is celebrated on a different day, usually on a weekday so as to keep the crowds manageable. People gather at 23:59 at the City Hall and make as much noise as possible for several hours with drums, cymbals, bowls, whistles, pans, or other objects.

Pobre de mí
After nine days of partying, the people of Pamplona meet in the City Hall Plaza at midnight on July 14, singing the traditional mournful notes of the Pobre de Mí ('Poor Me'), in a candlelit ending. The city mayor closes the festival with participants lighting a candle and removing their red handkerchief as the song is played by the local band, followed by a fireworks display at the city hall. This closing ceremony tradition, which marks the official close of the festivities, started out in the 1920s.

Daily events

Running of the bulls

The running of the bulls (In Spanish encierro or los toros de san Fermin) involves hundreds of people running in front of six bulls and another six steers down an 825-meter (0.51 mile) stretch of narrow streets of a section of the old town of Pamplona. The run ends in the Pamplona's bullring taking a mean time of around 3 minutes where the bulls would be held until the afternoon's bullfight when they would be killed. Bullruns are held between July 7 and 14 and a different "encaste" (sub-breed) of bull appears for each day of the festival.

The event begins at 08:00 when a first firecracker is lit to announce the release of the bulls from their corral. Before the year 1924 it started at 6 and at 7 between 1924 and 1974.  Runners gather earlier at the beginning of the itinerary to ask for the protection of the Saint by singing a chant three times before a small statue of San Fermín which has been placed in a raised niche in a wall, in both Spanish and Basque:

“A San Fermín pedimos, por ser nuestro patrón, nos guíe en el encierro, dándonos su bendición.Entzun, arren, San Fermin zu zaitugu patroi, zuzendu gure oinak entzierro hontan otoi.” (Both of which means “To San Fermin we ask to be our patron saint and to guide us in the running of the bulls, giving to us his blessing”)

Viva San Fermin and Gora San Fermin are shouted following the chant. While the chant since 1962 has been sung in Spanish, beginning 2009 a Basque translation is sung following.

A second cracker signals that the last bull has left the corral. There are six fighting bulls accompanied by six oxen (often white and brown coloured) that guide them to the "plaza" and followed by three more not fighting oxen. There are also some shepherds guiding the bulls, wearing green T-shirts and holding long poles.  Once all of the bulls have entered the arena, a third rocket is released while a fourth firecracker indicates that the bulls are in their bullpens and the run has concluded. After the end of the run young cows with wrapped horns are released in the bullring and toss the participants, to the amusement of the crowd.

The circuit has only changed slightly since 1852 as the former bullring was located close to the present one. Before that date the bullrunning ended in the "castle plaza", still not far from the present bullring. While the origin of this tradition was the necessity to move the bulls from outside the city to the bullring for the bullfight it is not clear when citizens began to run in front of them. There are written records in 1787 that the tradition was already well established with no memory of its beginning. The tradition of singing for protection to the saint dates back to 1962.

The event is dangerous. Since 1925, 15 people have been killed during the event – most recently on July 10, 2009—and every year between 200 and 300 people are injured during the run although most injuries are contusions due to falls and are not serious.

TVE beams this more famous activity of the festivities to millions nationwide and internationally, and clips of the run itself - and the slow motion highlights from cameras placed on the route of the run - are uploaded minutes after the run on the RTVE Youtube channel.

Giants and big-heads parade

Every day, during the morning, there is a parade of gigantes y cabezudos (English: "giants and big-heads", respectively), with the giant figures being more than 150 years old. The eight giant figures were built by Tadeo Amorena, a painter from Pamplona, in 1860, and represent four pairs of kings and queens of four different races and places (Europe, Asia, America and Africa). Their height is around  each, and they are carried by a dancer inside a wooden structure. During the parade, giants dance following the rhythm of traditional music. The remaining 17 figures include 6 kilikis, 5 big-heads, and 6 zaldikos, built at different times between 1860 and 1941. Kilikis and big-heads are caricaturesque, but human-like figures that are carried as helmets. While big-heads simply precede the giants and wave their hands at spectators, kilikis run after children, hitting them with a foam truncheon. Zaldikos, figures representing horses with their riders, also run after children with a truncheon.

Traditional sports

There are exhibitions and competitions of Basque rural sports every morning in the "Plaza de los Fueros", a square close to the city citadel, although they were formerly held in the bullring. Sports include stone lifting, wood cutting, or hay bale lifting. On the other hand, the Jai alai tournament of Sanfermin is a prestigious competition of this variety of basque pelota. It is held in one of the courts of the city. Betting is common during these events.

Bullfight
Every afternoon from July 7 to 14 there is a bullfight in which the 6 bulls that have been driven to the bullring during the bullrunning of that day are killed. It begins at 18:00. In addition the 5th bullfight with younger bulls and not fully trained bullfighters is performed while the 6th features bullfighters on horses (in Spanish "rejoneo"). While the bullring of the city is the fourth largest in size in the world, it is full every afternoon and tickets are hard to find.

Fireworks
Every night at 23:00, a firework spectacle is held at the citadel park. Fireworks spectacles have been known to occur in Sanfermin as far back as 1595. From 2000 to 2019 & since 2022, an international fireworks contest is held. Thousands of people watch them seated on the grass around the citadel.

See also
Fiestas of International Tourist Interest of Spain

Notes

References

External links 
 Fiesta of San Fermín at Spanish National Television website, RTVE.es
 The running of the bulls Encierros San Fermín Live at 07.15 AM Central European Time, GMT+2
 Official guide to the fiesta of San Fermín. 
 Unofficial website on San Fermín and on encierro
 photosanfermin.com San Fermín social network
 Tips to run in safety and to contribute in preserving the Festival

Patronal festivals in Spain
July events
Navarre culture
Tourist attractions in Navarre
Pamplona